The Tam Kung Temple is a temple in Coloane, Macau, China. It is dedicated to Tam Kung.

History
The temple was constructed in 1862 during the Portuguese Macau.

Architecture
There is a long whale bone with the shape of dragon boat inside the temple main altar. There is also a bronze spouting bowl in the hall.

See also
 Tam Kung
 A-Ma Temple, built in 1488
 Kun Iam Temple, built in 1627
 Na Tcha Temple, built in 1888
 Sam Kai Vui Kun
 Tam Kung Temple, located at Mile 1.5 of North Road in Sandakan, Sabah, Malaysia
 List of tourist attractions in Macau

References

Taoist temples in Macau
Coloane
1862 establishments in China
1862 establishments in the Portuguese Empire
19th-century establishments in Macau